Artsyz is a former Ukrainian Air Force base located near Artsyz, Odesa Oblast, Ukraine.

The base was home to the 37th Guards Military Transport Aviation Regiment of the Soviet Air Forces using the Ilyushin Il-76MD and the 90th Independent Assault Aviation Regiment with the Sukhoi Su-25 between 1983 and 1989.

References

Ukrainian airbases